The Church of St. Barnabas is a Roman Catholic parish church under the authority of the Roman Catholic Archdiocese of New York, located at Martha Avenue near East 241st Street in Woodlawn Heights, The Bronx, New York City. The parish was established in July 1910 by the Rev. Michael A. Reilly, separated from the Bronx parish of St. Frances of Rome. It is one of the largest parishes in the Archdiocese.

Buildings
The church building was built 1911. The Italianate church was dedicated by Cardinal John M. Farley in November 1911. When opened, it accommodated 700. A temporary school was opened in 1911, with 200 students, staffed by seven Sisters of Charity nuns. Opposite the church, a convent for the Sisters of Charity was opened in January 1913 at a cost of $8,000 (which in 1914 still had a debt of $5,500). In 1914, the parish numbered around 1,000, and the property was valued at $100,000, with a debt of $59,500. The chapel and high school building were erected during the pastorship of Msgr. George McWeeney (1947-1965). During the 1980s, up to 22 masses were celebrated in the parish each week. The rectory, parish center and high school chapel were renovated during the pastorate of Msgr. Timothy S. Collins (1986-1994).

Music
The church has had at least four organs over its 100-year history. The first was installed by the Estey Organ Company of Brattleboro, Vermont around 1911. The second was created by George S. Hutchings of Boston, Massachusetts in 1890, installed around 1948 and restored in 1988. The third was installed by Jaeckel Organs, Inc. of Duluth, Minnesota in 1985. The Peragallo Pipe Organ Company of Paterson, New Jersey installed the present organ in 2009.

Parish Schools
St. Barnabas Elementary School is located at 413 East 241st Street, Bronx, NY 10470. The school has full pre-kindergarten programs, and includes grades from pre-k to eighth grade. Mr. Jonathan Morano serves as Principal (2015–Present) of St. Barnabas Elementary School and Mr. Stephen Marositz serves as Vice Principal (2018–Present). St. Barnabas High School is located at 425 East 240th Street, Bronx, N.Y., 10470. It is an all-girls Catholic parish school that offers a college prep program to young women in Grades 9–12. During the 1980s, there were over 1500 enrolled in the parish elementary school and 800 enrolled in the high school. The high school has since been independent from the parish as of September 2015.

Pastors
 1910-1947: Msgr. Michael A. Reilly (1873-1947), the first pastor was the New York City-born Rev. Reilly, who graduated from St. Francis Xavier's College and Dunwoodie Seminary. He was ordained in 1898 and served as assistant at St. Peter's Church (Poughkeepsie, New York) until being transferred to the New York Apsotolate in 1902 where he remained until 1910, when he founded St. Barnabas. Under his pastorship, he built the church, the schools, the convent, and the rectory, and the parish became one of the largest in the Archdiocese. Consequently, he was elevated to the position of monsignor and died in 1947.
 1947-1965: Msgr. George McWeeney, erected the new high school building and chapel were erected.
 1965-1986: Msgr. John J. Considine
 1986-1994: Msgr. Timothy S. Collins, transferred to become pastor of Our Lady of the Rosary Church, Manhattan (The Mother Seton Shrine).
 1994-2003: Msgr. Francis X. Toner, reorganized parish services and served until his death.
 2003–2015: Msgr. Edward M. Barry
 2015–Present: Father Brendan Fitzgerald

References

External links
 Official Church Website
 Official Church Website Parish History
 St. Barnabas Elementary School
 St. Barnabas High School
 NYC Organ Website

Christian organizations established in 1910
Roman Catholic churches in the Bronx
Italianate architecture in New York City
Roman Catholic churches completed in 1911
Private middle schools in the Bronx
1910 establishments in New York City
Catholic elementary schools in the Bronx
20th-century Roman Catholic church buildings in the United States
Italianate church buildings in the United States